Left of Catalonia–Electoral Democratic Front (EC–FED), often shortened as just Left of Catalonia, was a left-wing political platform in Catalonia, formed by Republican Left of Catalonia (ERC), the Party of Labour of Catalonia (PTC) and Catalan State (EC) to contest the 1977 Spanish general election. The alliance was formed to allow the three parties to run for election, as they had not been yet legalized at the time. The alliance ran lists in all four Catalan constituencies for the Congress of Deputies, whereas for the Spanish Senate it supported the Agreement of the Catalans coalition. Its referent at the Spanish level was the Democratic Left Front (FDI).

EC–FED obtained the 143,954 votes (4.72% of the total) and 1 seat for Barcelona, and was dissolved shortly after the election.

Composition

Electoral performance

Congress of Deputies

References

Gonzalo Wilhelmi: Romper el consenso. La izquierda radical en la Transición (1975–1982). Siglo XXI Editores, Madrid, 2016, .

1977 establishments in Spain
1977 disestablishments in Spain
Defunct political party alliances in Spain
Political parties established in 1977
Political parties disestablished in 1977